= Type 865 reconnaissance boat =

Type of Chinese reconnaissance boat

Class overview
- Operators: People's Liberation Army Navy

General characteristics
- Type: Gunboat
- Displacement: 9.24 tonnes (9.09 long tons; 10.19 short tons)
- Length: 13 m (42 ft 8 in)
- Beam: 2.91 m (9 ft 7 in)
- Installed power: Internal combustion engine
- Propulsion: Diesel engine
- Speed: 13 knots (24 km/h; 15 mph)
- Sensors & processing systems: 1 × navigational radar
- Armament: 1 × 12.7 mm (0.50 in) guns

Type 865 reconnaissance boat is a type of reconnaissance boat developed by China for the People's Liberation Army Navy (PLAN) to deliver reconnaissance and special forces.
